Six hungry families was a phrase used in the 1880s and 1890s to describe six of the most prominent and powerful families in colonial Western Australia, with extensive influence in judicial, political, mercantile and social circles. It was first used by John Horgan during his unsuccessful 1886 campaign for election to the Western Australian Legislative Council.

Horgan used the phrase to imply that the families were hungry for more wealth, power, influence and land, and that this was at the expense of the working class. He was later successfully sued for libel by George Walpole Leake, a member of one of the "six hungry families", and fined £500.

Roughly speaking, the "six hungry families" were:
 the Leake family;
 the Stone family;
 the Lee Steere family;
 the Shenton family;
 the Lefroy family;
 the Burt family.
However, there was extensive intermarriage between these and other influential families, and a person could be a member of one or more of these families without possessing any of the six surnames. Essentially, the term six hungry families referred to a single nebulous class of colonists, rather than six distinct families.

Prominent members of the "six hungry families" included:
 Leake family:
 George Walpole Leake
 George Leake
 Sir Luke Leake
 Stone family:
 Alfred Hawes Stone
 Sir Edward Albert Stone
 Frank Mends Stone
 George Frederick Stone
 Patrick Stone
 Lee Steere family:
 Sir James George Lee Steere
 Sir Ernest Augustus Lee Steere
 Shenton family:
Arthur Shenton
Edward Shenton
Ernest Shenton
George Shenton Sr
Sir George Shenton
William Kernott Shenton
Lefroy family
Sir Anthony O'Grady Lefroy
Sir Edward Lefroy
Gerald de Courcy Lefroy
Henry Lefroy
Burt family
Sir Archibald Burt
Sir Francis Burt
Septimus Burt
Octavius Burt

Notes

References

Further reading
 Altham, John.(2005) The unveiling of portraits of former Chief Justices, Sir Alexander Onslow, Kt (1842-1908), Sir Edward Stone, Kt (1844-1920) Brief (Law Society of Western Australia), September 2005, pp. 27–28.

Australian families
English phrases
History of Western Australia
People from Perth, Western Australia